Lutho Addington Tapela was the Zimbabwe Deputy Minister of Higher and Tertiary Education. He was the Senator for Bulilima-Mangwe (MDC-M). He died 19 January 2018.

References

20th-century births
2018 deaths
Members of the Senate of Zimbabwe
Year of birth missing